The following are the national records in athletics in Portugal maintained by its national athletics federation: Federação Portuguesa de Atletismo (FPA).

Outdoor

Key to tables:

+ = en route to a longer distance

h = hand timing

OT = oversized track (> 200m in circumference)

Mx = mark was made in a mixed race

a = aided road course according to IAAF rule 260.28

Men

Women

Indoor

Men

Women

Mixed

Notes

References
General
Portuguese Outdoor Records 13 May 2022 updated
Portuguese Indoor Records 18 March 2022 updated
Specific

Further reading

External links
FPA web site

Portugal
Records
Athletics
Athletics